Article often refers to:
 Article (grammar), a grammatical element used to indicate definiteness or indefiniteness
 Article (publishing), a piece of nonfictional prose that is an independent part of a publication

Article may also refer to:

Government and law
 Article (European Union), articles of treaties of the European Union
 Articles of association, the regulations governing a company, used in India, the UK and other countries
 Articles of clerkship, the contract accepted to become an articled clerk
 Articles of Confederation, the predecessor to the current United States Constitution
Article of Impeachment, a formal document and charge used for impeachment in the United States
 Articles of incorporation, for corporations, U.S. equivalent of articles of association
 Articles of organization, for limited liability organizations, a U.S. equivalent of articles of association

Other uses
 Article, an HTML element, delimited by the tags  and 
 Article of clothing, an item of clothing
 "Articles", a song on the 1993 album Un-Sentimental by Beowülf
 Articles of faith, sets of beliefs usually found in creeds
 RDS-1, the Soviet Union's first atomic test device, code-named "the article"

See also
 Artical (disambiguation)
 Article One (disambiguation)
 Article Two (disambiguation)
 Article Three (disambiguation)
 Article Four (disambiguation)
 Article Five (disambiguation)
 Article Six (disambiguation)
 Article Seven (disambiguation)
 Article 15 (disambiguation)
 Articles of Religion (disambiguation)